File Treviño is a Mexican artist author from Monterrey, Nuevo León, noted for creating the world's largest pencil drawing.

References

Mexican artists
Living people
Year of birth missing (living people)